Mukilteo Lighthouse Park encompasses the lighthouse at the west end of the city of Mukilteo, Washington, and  south of it. The property is west and south of the Washington State Ferries terminal with ferry service to Clinton, Whidbey Island, and is bordered on the south and east by the BNSF Railway (formerly the Burlington Northern Railroad) mainline.  Whidbey Island lies across a narrow portion of Possession Sound and is easily visible from the shore.

This park was formerly known as Mukilteo State Park. The lighthouse was deeded to the City of Mukilteo in 2001, and Washington State Parks deeded the parklands to the City in 2003. In 2004, the City adopted a Lighthouse Park Master Plan to make physical site improvements in four phases. Phases I and II have been completed, adding amenities and parking. The artwork by Joe Gobin and James Madison, Tulalip Tribal carvers, indicates the significance of this site to many tribes, especially the Tulalip Tribes of Snohomish County, who lived at this location for over 1,000 years until European-American occupation in the mid-nineteenth century. The 1855 Point Elliott Treaty was signed in the area and three tribes were forced to re-settle at Tulalip Bay across Port Gardner Bay. Lighthouse Park is also significant as Captain George Vancouver's naturalist landed a small craft on the shoreline on May 31, 1792. Vancouver named the area Rose Point, a name today reflected in that of the nearby community of Rosehill.

It is one of the most easily accessed shorelines in urban Snohomish County, especially for those needing ADA access.

Amenities
Volleyball net
Playground
Picnic tables
Fire pits
Outlets
Restrooms
Lighthouse

References

External links
City of Mukilteo, Washington Parks website
Mukilteo Lighthouse, Washington at Lighthousefriends.com

State parks of Washington (state)
Parks in Snohomish County, Washington